Pollastri is an Italian surname. Notable people with it include:

Augusto Pollastri (1877–1927), Italian violin maker
Bartolomeo Pollastri (... – 18th century), Italian mathematician and astronomer
Gaetano Pollastri (1886–1960), Italian luthier

Italian-language surnames